Alerte aux Pieds Bleus is a Lucky Luke adventure in French, written and illustrated by Morris it was the tenth title in the original series and was published by Dupuis in 1958 and by Cinebook in English as The Bluefeet are coming!. It is unique in the sense that it was the only story published solo by Morris after starting a collaboration with René Goscinny.

Plot summary 

Convinced that they will find firewater among the palefaces, blue-foot (like the Blackfoot) Indians besiege the town ... Lucky Luke will see all the colors! 

In Rattlesnake Valley, Arizona, Pedro Cucaracha is causing a stir by defrauding the locals in poker. Lucky Luke, who had stopped there by chance, catches him playing against the city's peacekeeper, Sheriff Jerry Grindstone. Thanks to his dexterity with regard to persuasion by arms, the cowboy has no trouble scaring the cheater of Mexican origin who runs away quickly. To take revenge, he appeals to the Bluefeet, an Indian tribe of the valley, for compensation in kind (alcohol). The latter besiege the city, which they eventually lose, trying to attack as the cavalry arrives to settle the situation.

Characters 

 Pedro Cucaracha: Crook of Mexican origin, having cheated the majority of the city of Rattlesnake in poker.
 Sheriff Jerry Grindstone: Sheriff of Rattlesnake Valley, poker lover (even if he plays it badly), he is very superstitious but also very unlucky.
 Thirsty Bear: Chief of the Bluefeet. Has an avowed taste for alcohol and is ready to start a war for more stocks.
 Wolf Head: Chief of the Greenfeet.
 Chamois Leather: Chief of the Yellowfeet.

History 
Because René Goscinny left for the United States to launch a magazine (TV Family) Morris produced this album on his own. Goscinny wrote the scripts for all of the following albums until his death in 1977.

References

 Morris publications in Spirou BDoubliées

External links
Official Website 

Comics by Morris (cartoonist)
Lucky Luke albums
1958 graphic novels
Works originally published in Spirou (magazine)